Elizabeth Ann Dewar Churcher  (née Cameron; 11 January 193131 March 2015) was an Australian arts administrator, best known as director of the National Gallery of Australia from 1990 to 1997. She was also a painter in her own right earlier in her life.

Early life and education
Elizabeth Cameron was born on 11 January 1931 in Brisbane. From age 7 to 15 she attended Somerville House school, paid for by her grandmother. There she was taught art by Patricia Prentice. She left school after grade 10 because her father did not think she needed a higher education.

In 1942 as an 11-year-old, Churcher saw Blandford Fletcher's Evicted at the Queensland Art Gallery, which inspired her to become an artist. After leaving school, she studied under artist Caroline Barker.

Churcher won a travelling scholarship to Europe and attended the Royal College of Art in London. She received a Master of Arts from the Courtauld Institute of Art, University of London, in 1977.

Career

In the years preceding the formation of the Queensland Branch of the Contemporary Art Society, Betty and her husband Roy Churcher involved a new group of people who were interested in contemporary art (in particular modernism) in Brisbane. (Roy was a key instigator of the establishment of the society, and became one of two inaugural vice-presidents when it was established in 1961.)

Between 1972 and 1975, Churcher was art critic for The Australian newspaper.

She became Dean of School of Art and Design in 1982, and taught Art History at the progressive Phillip Institute of Technology (now RMIT University) until 1987, when she was appointed director of the Art Gallery of Western Australia. She left in 1990 after disagreements with Robert Holmes à Court about the gallery's acquisition of a Pierre Bonnard painting.

She was then appointed director of the Australian National Gallery. She hosted several television shows in the 1990s and authored several books, including The Art of War about war artists.

While director of the National Gallery, she was dubbed "Betty Blockbuster" because of her love of blockbuster exhibitions and for her love of movies. Churcher initiated the building of new galleries on the eastern side of the building, opened in March 1998, to house large-scale temporary exhibitions. She changed the name of the Gallery from the Australian National Gallery to its current title. During her tenure the museum also purchased Golden Summer, Eaglemont by Arthur Streeton for $3.5 million. This was the last great picture from the Heidelberg School still in private hands.

Churcher dedicated her time to displaying hidden artworks and lesser known acquisitions of the National Gallery of Australia in a television program called Hidden Treasures on the Australian Broadcasting Corporation.

Recognition
In 1996 a portrait of Churcher painted by her son, Peter Churcher, and titled Betty at Home was a finalist in the Archibald Prize. The prize is awarded for the "best portrait painting preferentially of some man or woman distinguished in Art, Letters, Science or Politics". Davida Allen painted a portrait of her in 1990, titled Hey Betty.

In 2001, Churcher was inducted into the Victorian Honour Roll of Women.

Death and legacy
Churcher died of cancer on 31 March 2015 at the age of 84.

After her death she was described by one writer as "a seminal figure in the arts sector, a superior curator and administrator as well as a gifted communicator who introduced Australians to the world of art outside the national collections".

The National Gallery of Australia introduced the Betty Churcher Memorial Oration in 2022; the inaugural speaker was the Australian director of the Hirshhorn Museum in Washington, Melissa Chiu.

Family
Betty was married to Roy (1933–2014) and had four sons and seven grandchildren. One son is the artist Peter Churcher.

Bibliography

Books

Critical studies and reviews

See also
Women in the art history field

Notes

External links

Hidden Treasures with Betty Churcher
Biography and interview
Biography by Glenn R. Cooke, in Dictionary of Australian Artists
Educational Resources involving Betty Churcher

"Betty Churcher: A mission to turn art into an adventure" by Matthew Westwood and Victoria Laurie, 'The Australian'', 31 March 2015
Roy and Betty Churcher digital story, State Library of Queensland. Part of the Johnstone Gallery digital stories and oral histories collection

1931 births
2015 deaths
Australian curators
Directors of the National Gallery of Australia
Alumni of the Courtauld Institute of Art
Alumni of the Royal College of Art
Australian women writers
Australian writers
Australian women painters
Women art historians
Officers of the Order of Australia
Recipients of the Centenary Medal
Fellows of the Australian Academy of the Humanities
Australian National University alumni
Academic staff of the Australian National University
Academic staff of RMIT University
People from Brisbane
Deaths from cancer in New South Wales
Australian people of Scottish descent
Australian art gallery directors
Australian women curators